The term staff of life may refer to:

Among Western Eurasian (Caucasian) people, staff of life is a poetic and cultural term for bread or other staple foods.
It is the name of one of the chapters of Patti Smith's book, The Coral Sea.

See also
 Star of life, the symbol used by many emergency medical services.
 Staff of Aesculapius, a serpent-entwined rod wielded by the Greek god Asclepius, a deity associated with healing and medicine.